Hansbrough is a surname. Notable people with the surname include:

 Ben Hansbrough (born 1987), American professional basketball player who played for the Notre Dame Fighting Irish, brother of Tyler Hansbrough
 Henry C. Hansbrough (1848–1933), American politician
 Tyler Hansbrough (born 1985), American NBA player, brother of Ben Hansbrough